Varinjam Sree Subramanya Swamy Temple is a famous Lord Murugan Temple located just 3.6 km from Chathannoor, Kollam, Kerala, India.

References

Hindu temples in Kollam district
Murugan temples in Kerala